Blondes by Choice is an American silent comedy film directed by Hampton Del Ruth and starring Claire Windsor. The script was written by Josephine Quirk and Paul Perez.

Plot 
When a man named Cliff's car breaks down, he is towed into the nearest town by a female motorist. It turns out the woman is named Bonnie, and she is the owner of a soon-to-be-opening beauty parlor that has riled up the town.

When she bleaches her hair to stimulate business, a local women's group comes to protest, but she orders them out. But then Cliff's wealthy mother brings Bonnie to a yacht party as her guest of honor, and the local women change their tune and decide to patronize her business; soon she pays off her mortgage and is proposed to by Cliff.

Starring 

 Claire Windsor as Bonnie Clinton
 Allan Simpson as Cliff Bennett
 Walter Hiers as Horace Rush
 Bodil Rosing as Caroline Bennett
 Bess Flowers as Olga Flint
 Lee Willard as Benjamin Flint
 Mai Wells as Miss Terwilliger

Release 
The film was well received by critics; The Casper Star-Tribune, for example, called it a "fast-moving and amusing affair," noting its expert direction. A reviewer for The Hartford Courant lauded it for its "genuinely hilarious" humor, "high-caliber" cast, and snappy pace.

References 

1927 films
American silent feature films
1927 comedy films
Silent American comedy films
Films directed by Hampton Del Ruth
Gotham Pictures films
1920s English-language films
1920s American films